Kokrajhar Lok Sabha constituency is one of the 14 Lok Sabha constituencies in Assam state in north-eastern India. The seat is reserved for scheduled tribes.

Assembly segments 
Kokrajhar Vidhan Sabha constituency is composed of the following assembly segments:

Members of Parliament

Election Results

2019 General Elections

General elections 2014

References

See also
 Kokrajhar district
 List of Constituencies of the Lok Sabha

Lok Sabha constituencies in Assam
Kokrajhar district